Alan Didak (born 15 February 1983) is a former professional Australian rules footballer of Croatian descent who played for the Collingwood Football Club in the Australian Football League. Didak was a fan favourite and legend of the club, known for his incredible foot skills, marking prowess, and ability to kick seemingly impossible goals.

Early life 
Originally from Whyalla, South Australia, Didak made his South Australian National Football League (SANFL) senior debut for Port Adelaide Football Club aged 17 years. He was the captain of the Under-18 Australian International rules football team in the junior International Rules Series against Ireland.

AFL career 
Didak was drafted by the Collingwood Football Club with the 3rd pick in the 2000 AFL Draft, and in 2001 he made his AFL debut against the Kangaroos at the Telstra Dome in Round 7, gathering 10 possessions. He became a member of the exclusive club of players to kick a goal with both his first kick and first disposal. He played five games in total in 2001.

In 2002, Didak earned an AFL Rising Star nomination.
Didak was an extremely talented small forward and was also very capable in the midfield. He was known for his accurate goal kicking and clutch ability which often saw him likened to club legend Peter Daicos.

In 2003, Didak enjoyed his best season to date. In the Qualifying Final against Premiership favourites the Brisbane Lions, Didak came on in the last quarter and kicked two legendary goals to win the match which remain Collingwood folklore to this day. 

In 2005, Didak's season was disrupted by injuries and problems. He had knee surgery during the pre-season, setting him up for his first game on ANZAC Day against Essendon. His injury had an effect upon his performances. Having had minor issues since the mid-year break, he was suspended in Round 14 for two matches and after returning from that, he injured an ankle. When he returned in the next week, he lasted only 20 minutes, before suddenly fainting on the ground with an irregular heart beat.

In 2006 Didak was awarded the Copeland Trophy as the best and fairest Collingwood player for 2006. Didak was awarded All-Australian selection for the first time in his career.

In 2010, Didak enjoyed his career best season, winning the club goalkicking with 41 goals and earning All-Australian selection. Didak placed 4th in the club's Best & Fairest, and was a hero of Collingwood's 15th premiership.

Didak started off 2011 strongly in a dominant Collingwood side; however, he began to succumb to injuries, which became a common theme until he was delisted at the end of the 2013 season after 13 seasons.

Post-AFL career 
Didak played one game for the Glenorchy Football Club in the TSL in 2014.

Didak finished his AFL Career with 218 games and 274 goals, placing him 8th on the all-time Collingwood goalkicking list. He played in an incredible 5 grand finals

Since his retirement, Didak has been awarded life membership for the club in 2015, and was inducted into the Collingwood Hall of Fame in 2017. 

He currently is a logistics consultant and owns his own wine company, INDI Wines.

Personal life 
In late June 2007, it was revealed that Didak had met with Christopher Hudson, the self-confessed shooter in the 2007 Melbourne CBD shootings days before the shootings took place. According to police, Didak left the Spearmint Rhino with Hudson, where Hudson then allegedly fired random shots before travelling to the Hells Angels' East County Chapter headquarters in Campbellfield. Police believe that Didak was later dropped off near Southbank after the shooting incidents about 6.00am.

On 3 August 2008, Didak was a passenger in a car being driven by intoxicated teammate Heath Shaw which collided with another parked car. Both men initially denied that Didak was in any way involved. However, witness accounts to the incident identified him and, on 4 August 2008, both men were fined and suspended for the remainder of the season over the deception.

On 6 September 2012, Alan became a first time dad to daughter Indiana Willow Didak with his long-term partner Jacinta Jellett.

Statistics

|- style="background-color: #EAEAEA"
! scope="row" style="text-align:center" | 2001
|style="text-align:center;"|
| 4 || 5 || 3 || 0 || 19 || 9 || 28 || 10 || 2 || 0.6 || 0.0 || 3.8 || 1.8 || 5.6 || 2.0 || 0.4 || 0
|- 
! scope="row" style="text-align:center" | 2002
|style="text-align:center;"|
| 4 || 19 || 24 || 10 || 147 || 46 || 193 || 51 || 24 || 1.3 || 0.5 || 7.7 || 2.4 || 10.2 || 2.7 || 1.3 || 0
|- style="background:#eaeaea;"
! scope="row" style="text-align:center" | 2003
|style="text-align:center;"|
| 4 || 25 || 36 || 22 || 177 || 77 || 254 || 83 || 33 || 1.4 || 0.9 || 7.1 || 3.1 || 10.2 || 3.3 || 1.3 || 0
|- 
! scope="row" style="text-align:center" | 2004
|style="text-align:center;"|
| 4 || 18 || 21 || 26 || 186 || 42 || 228 || 76 || 22 || 1.2 || 1.4 || 10.3 || 2.3 || 12.7 || 4.2 || 1.2 || 2
|- style="background:#eaeaea;"
! scope="row" style="text-align:center" | 2005
|style="text-align:center;"|
| 4 || 12 || 21 || 9 || 105 || 30 || 135 || 42 || 17 || 1.8 || 0.8 || 8.8 || 2.5 || 11.3 || 3.5 || 1.4 || 1
|- 
! scope="row" style="text-align:center" | 2006
|style="text-align:center;"|
| 4 || 23 || 41 || 23 || 280 || 116 || 396 || 136 || 46 || 1.8 || 1.0 || 12.2 || 5.0 || 17.2 || 5.9 || 2.0 || 4
|- style="background:#eaeaea;"
! scope="row" style="text-align:center" | 2007
|style="text-align:center;"|
| 4 || 18 || 25 || 6 || 191 || 77 || 268 || 68 || 46 || 1.4 || 0.3 || 10.6 || 4.3 || 14.9 || 3.8 || 2.6 || 0
|- 
! scope="row" style="text-align:center" | 2008
|style="text-align:center;"|
| 4 || 18 || 24 || 15 || 325 || 77 || 402 || 102 || 38 || 1.3 || 0.8 || 18.1 || 4.3 || 22.3 || 5.7 || 2.1 || 3
|- style="background:#eaeaea;"
! scope="row" style="text-align:center" | 2009
|style="text-align:center;"|
| 4 || 20 || 20 || 12 || 358 || 152 || 510 || 101 || 37 || 1.0 || 0.6 || 17.9 || 7.6 || 25.5 || 5.1 || 1.9 || 12
|- 
! scope="row" style="text-align:center" | 2010
|style="text-align:center;"|
| 4 || 24 || 41 || 21 || 350 || 240 || 590 || 101 || 65 || 1.7 || 0.9 || 14.6 || 10.0 || 24.6 || 4.2 || 2.7 || 11
|- style="background:#eaeaea;"
! scope="row" style="text-align:center" | 2011
|style="text-align:center;"|
| 4 || 20 || 9 || 9 || 238 || 117 || 355 || 63 || 43 || 0.5 || 0.5 || 11.9 || 5.9 || 17.8 || 3.2 || 2.2 || 0
|- 
! scope="row" style="text-align:center" | 2012
|style="text-align:center;"|
| 4 || 11 || 6 || 7 || 130 || 51 || 181 || 39 || 11 || 0.5 || 0.6 || 11.8 || 4.6 || 16.5 || 3.5 || 1.0 || 0
|- style="background:#eaeaea;"
! scope="row" style="text-align:center" | 2013
|style="text-align:center;"|
| 4 || 5 || 3 || 4 || 48 || 37 || 85 || 18 || 4 || 0.6 || 0.8 || 9.6 || 7.4 || 17.0 || 3.6 || 0.8 || 0
|- class="sortbottom"
! colspan=3| Career
! 218
! 274
! 164
! 2554
! 1071
! 3625
! 890
! 388
! 1.3
! 0.8
! 11.7
! 4.9
! 16.6
! 4.1
! 1.8
! 33
|}

References

External links 

1983 births
Living people
Collingwood Football Club players
Collingwood Football Club Premiership players
Copeland Trophy winners
All-Australians (AFL)
Australian people of Croatian descent
Australian rules footballers from South Australia
Port Adelaide Magpies players
Glenorchy Football Club players
Australia international rules football team players
One-time VFL/AFL Premiership players
People from Whyalla